This is a list of topics related to Indonesia.

Cities in Indonesia
 List of regencies and cities of Indonesia
 List of cities in Indonesia including population statistics

Jakarta

Lists
 Colonial buildings and structures in Jakarta
 Governors of Jakarta
 Radio stations in Jakarta

Areas of Jakarta

Districts of Jakarta
List of districts of Jakarta

Buildings and structures in Jakarta
 See Architecture of Indonesia

Transport in Jakarta

Communications in Indonesia
 Communications in Indonesia
 .id
 Internet in Indonesia
 Palapa

Mobile phone companies of Indonesia
 Indosat Ooredoo Hutchison
 Smartfren
 Telkomsel
 XL Axiata

Indonesian culture

Indonesian architecture
 Indonesian architecture

Traditional architecture

Buildings and structures in Indonesia

 Kelong
 Villa Isola

Buildings and structures in Jakarta

Palaces in Indonesia
 Istana Bogor
 Istana Luwu
 Istana Maimun
 Istana Merdeka
 Istana Negara, Jakarta
 Istana Wakil Presiden

Prisons
 Kambangan Island

Shopping malls
 #Shopping malls in Jakarta
 #Shopping malls in Bandung
 #Shopping malls in Surabaya
 #Shopping malls in Batam

Towers
 Monumen Nasional
 Wisma 46

Architects
 Albert Aalbers
 Thomas Karsten
 Gunadharma

Indonesian art and culture
 Bisj Pole

Artists
 List of Indonesian painters

Photographers
 Isidore van Kinsbergen

Indonesian culture

Indonesian folklore and Balinese mythology
 Ameta
 Hainuwele
 Malin Kundang

Balinese mythology

Cinema

Useful links
 Cinema of Indonesia
 Indonesian Film Festival
 Jakarta International Film Festival
 Films of the Dutch East Indies
 Sejarah Film 1900-1950

Indonesian films
 Arisan!
 Gie
 Joni's Promise
 Long Road to Heaven

 What's Up with Love?
 Whispering Sands
 The Mirror Never Lies

Indonesian film directors
 Joko Anwar
 Rudy Soedjarwo

Actors

 Barry Prima
 Mariana Renata
 Pierre Roland
 Nora Samosir
 Dian Sastrowardoyo
 Tora Sudiro

 Suzzanna
 Yati Octavia
 Christine Hakim
 Evan Sanders
 Deddy Mizwar

Comedians

 Jojon
 Dorce Gamalama
 Tukul Arwana
 Peppy
 Mandra

 Tora Sudiro
 Didi Petet
 Sule (comedian)

Indonesian clothing

Indonesian cuisine
 List of Indonesian dishes

Languages of Indonesia

Indonesian language

Libraries and museums

Literature and writers

Old Sundanese Literature
 Bujangga Manik
 Sanghyang Siksakanda ng Karesian

Old Javanese Literature
 Kidung Sunda

Kakawin
 Kakawin Bhāratayuddha
 Bhinneka Tunggal Ika
 Kakawin Hariwangsa
 Kakawin
 Kakawin Rāmâyaṇa

Malay literature
 Hikayat Banjar
 Hikayat Bayan Budiman
 Hikayat Hang Tuah

Indonesian writers

Music and dance

Music of regions

Music styles

Musical performers

Composers
 List of Indonesian composers

Groups
 Kekal
 Nidji
 Peterpan (band)
 Sajama cut
 Sheila on 7
 Slank

Albums

Peterpan albums
 Bintang Di Surga

Musicians
 Gesang Martohartono
 Gugum Gumbira
 Nyoman Windha
 Sumarsam
 Jaya Suprana

 Sujud Sutrisno
 Ananda Sukarlan
 Ahmad Dhani
 Dewa Budjana

Dance

Economy

Businesspeople

Companies and banks

 List of companies
 List of airlines
 List of banks
 State-owned enterprises

Foreign companies
 Freeport-McMoRan
 PT Newmont Nusa Tenggara
 Thiess Contractors Indonesia

Energy

Mines
 Grasberg mine
 Ombilin
 Sebuku (Borneo)

Ports and harbours
 List of Indonesian ports

Trade unions
 Confederation of All Indonesian Workers' Union
 Confederation of Indonesia Prosperous Trade Union
 Indonesian Trade Union Confederation

Education
 Education in Indonesia

Schools in Indonesia

Universities and colleges
 List of universities
 List of universities in East Java
 List of agricultural universities and colleges

Environment of Indonesia

Natural history of Indonesia

Geography

Bays, beaches and headlands

Bays
 Cenderawasih Bay
 Jakarta Bay
 Staring-baai
 Buyat Bay

Beaches
 Dreamland Beach
 Jimbaran
 Kuta

 Legian
 Pangandaran
 Seminyak

Headlands
 Alas Purwo National Park
 Blambangan Peninsula
 Cape Selatan

Islands

Bali

Lakes and rivers

Lakes

Rivers

Maps of Indonesia

Towns and metropolitan areas
Towns

Metropolitan areas
 Jabotabek

National parks

Straits

Subdivisions of Indonesia

Regencies and cities
List of regencies and cities of Indonesia

Districts

Geography stubs

Geology

Mountains, mountain ranges and volcanos

Mountain ranges

Mountains of Indonesia

Volcanoes
 List of volcanoes

Government

Presidents

Foreign relations

Multilateral relations

Indonesian and foreign diplomats

Senior figures
 Sunaryati Hartono
 Adam Malik
 Prof. Mr. Soenario, S.H.

Ambassadors of Indonesia
 Indonesian Ambassadors to the United Kingdom
 Indonesian Ambassadors to Australia
 Prof. Mr. Soenario, S.H.
 Nugroho Wisnumurti

Ambassadors to Indonesia
 US Ambassadors to Indonesia
 Australian Ambassadors to Indonesia
New Zealand Ambassadors to Indonesia

Military of Indonesia

Main topics
 Military of Indonesia
 Denjaka
 Indonesian military ranks
 Jenderal Besar
 Kopassus
 Korps Marinir
 Kostrad
 Paspampres
 SS-1 (rifle)

Indonesian generals
 Sudirman
 Abdul Haris Nasution
 Prabowo
 Sudirman
 Suharto
 Djoko Suyanto
 Agus Wirahadikusumah
 Wiranto
 Sarwo Edhie Wibowo

Special forces
 Denjaka
 Detasemen Bravo
 Detachment 88
 KOPASKA
 Kopassus
 Paspampres
 Taifib
 Gegana

Politics

Elections

Political parties
 List of political parties in Indonesia

Youth wings of political parties in Indonesia
 People's Youth

Politicians

Indonesian communists

Health

Healthcare

Hospitals
 Bethesda Hospital Yogyakarta
 Panti Rapih Hospital

History
 History of Indonesia
 Indonesian monarchies
 Timeline of Indonesian history

Pre-colonial Indonesia (before 1602)

Srivijaya (3rd century–1400)
 I Ching (monk)
 Kedukan Bukit Inscription
 Liang Dao Ming
 Srivijaya

Melayu Kingdom (4th century-13th century)
 Melayu Kingdom

Sailendra (8th century-832)
 Sailendra
 Sanjaya Dynasty

Kingdom of Mataram (752–1045)
 Dharmawangsa
 Isyana Dynasty
 Mataram Kingdom
 Mpu Sindok

Kediri (1045–1221)
 Kediri kingdom

Singhasari (1222–1292)
 Singhasari
 Ken Dedes
 Tumapel

Majapahit (1293–1500)
 Adityawarman
 Majapahit
 Raden Wijaya

Sultanate of Demak
 Sultanate of Demak

Mataram Sultanate (1500s to 1700s)
 Mataram Sultanate

Dutch in Indonesia (1602–1945)

British invasion of Java (1811)
 Invasion of Java (1811)

Padri War (1821–1837)
 Padri War

Java War (1825–1830)
 Java War

Aceh War (1873–1904)

National Revival (1899–1942)
 Ahmad Dahlan
 Dutch Ethical Policy and Indonesian National Revival
 Samanhoedi
 Sarekat Islam
 Volksraad

Japanese Invasion (1941–1942)

 Battle of Ambon
 Battle of Badung Strait
 Battle of Makassar Strait
 Battle of Manado
 Battle of Tarakan (1942)
 Battle of the Java Sea
 Netherlands East Indies campaign

Japanese Occupation (1942–1945)

Independence (1945–1950)

1950s

1960s
 Maphilindo

Overthrow of Sukarno (1965–1966)
 Overthrow of Sukarno
 Supersemar

New Order (1965–1998)

Revolution of 1998 (1996–1998)

 Fall of Suharto
 Jakarta Riots of May 1998
 Reform era

21st century

Terrorism in Indonesia

2004 Indian Ocean earthquake (2004–present)
 Effect of the 2004 Indian Ocean earthquake on Indonesia

Archaeological sites

Disasters

Earthquakes

2004 Indian Ocean earthquake

Effect of the 2004 Indian Ocean earthquake by country
 Countries affected by the 2004 Indian Ocean earthquake
 Effect of the 2004 Indian Ocean earthquake on Indonesia

History of Java

History of Sumatra

Years in Indonesia
 List of years in Indonesia

Law and crime

Law enforcement
 KPK
 Law enforcement in Indonesia

Crime

Indonesian prisoners and detainees
 List of Indonesian prisoners and detainees
Indonesian criminals

Indonesia-related lists

Media

 Mass media in Indonesia
 .id
 Communications in Indonesia
 Public broadcasting in Indonesia

News agencies
 Antara
 KBR

Print media
 List of newspapers in Indonesia
 List of magazines in Indonesia

Journalists
 Budi Putra
 Sabam Siagian
 S.K. Trimurti

Indonesian radio
 List of radio stations in Indonesia
 Jakarta radio stations
 Bandung radio stations
 Pekanbaru radio stations
 Banda Aceh radio stations

Indonesian television
 Television in Indonesia
 List of television stations in Indonesia

Television programs
 Dunia Dalam Berita
 Klik Indonesia
 Seputar iNews
 Lintas iNews
 Buletin iNews
 Lintas (TV program)
 Buletin Malam
 Buletin Siang
 Extravaganza (TV series)
 Reportase
 Metro (TV program)
 Indonesia Today
 News Watch (Indonesian TV series)
 Indonesian Idol
 Indonesia Now
 Nuansa Pagi
 Seputar Peristiwa
 Seputar Indonesia
 Buletin Indonesia
 Liputan 6
 Fokus (TV program)
 Sergap (TV program)
 Si Unyil
 Indonesia Morning Show
 Jurnal VOA

People

List of Indonesians

Christian Indonesian Theologian
 Stephen Tong

Indonesian people by ethnic or national origin
 List of famous Indonesian Chinese

Indonesian monarchs
 Adityawarman
 Anusapati
 Hayam Wuruk
 Joyoboyo
 Ken Arok
 Ken Dedes
 Kertarajasa
 Mpu Sindok
 Panji Tohjaya

Sultans of Yogyakarta
 Hamengkubuwana I
 Hamengkubuwana II
 Hamengkubuwana III
 Hamengkubuwana IV
 Hamengkubuwana V
 Hamengkubuwana VI
 Hamengkubuwana VII
 Hamengkubuwana VIII
 Hamengkubuwana IX
 Hamengkubuwana X

Susuhuans of Surakarta
 Pakubuwana II
 Pakubuwana III
 Pakubuwana IV
 Pakubuwana V
 Pakubuwana VI
 Pakubuwana VII
 Pakubuwana VIII
 Pakubuwana IX
 Pakubuwana X
 Pakubuwana XI
 Pakubuwana XII

Indonesian people by occupation

Indonesian astronauts
 Taufik Akbar
 Pratiwi Sudarmono

Indonesian singers

Television personalities
 Amelia Natasha

People of Indonesian descent

Indonesian Americans
 Tania Gunadi
 John Juanda

Indonesian Australians
 Sophie Masson
 Jack van Tongeren

Indonesian Germans
 Nadine Chandrawinata

Provinces

West Java

Religion

Javanese beliefs
 Javanese sacred places
 Subud

Islam in Indonesia

Buddhist temples
 Candi of Indonesia
 Borobudur
 Candi Kalasan

Hindu temples
 Candi of Indonesia
 Candi Surawana
 Dieng Plateau
 Garuda Wisnu Kencana

 Mother Temple of Besakih
 Prambanan
 Pura Luhur

Roman Catholic dioceses
List of Roman Catholic dioceses

Science and technology
 Nuclear power in Indonesia
 National Institute of Aeronautics and Space

Ships of Indonesia
 KRI Wilhelmus Zakarias Yohannes

Tall ships of Indonesia
 KRI Dewaruci

Indonesian society

Ethnic groups

Organizations based in Indonesia

Youth organizations based in Indonesia

Scouting

Cemeteries

Sport
 Indonesia Seven Summits Expedition
 Sport in Indonesia
 Rally Indonesia

Football

Indonesian football clubs

Indonesian football competitions
 Liga Indonesia

Indonesian footballers
 Korintus Koliopas Fingkreuw
 Bambang Pamungkas
 Kurniawan Dwi Yulianto
 Zulkarnain Zakaria

Indonesian footballers by club – Semen Padang F.C. players
 Zulkarnain Zakaria

Football venues

Golf
 Indonesia Open
 Indonesian Masters

Indonesia at the Olympics

Olympic competitors for Indonesia

Sports governing bodies
 Java Australian Football League

Sportspeople
 Wynne Prakusya
 Ortizan Salossa
 Denny Sumargo

Archers
 Puspitasari Rina Dewi
 Nurfitriyana Saiman

Badminton players

Boxers
 Chris John (boxer)
 Ellyas Pical
 Muhammad Rachman
 Nico Thomas

Chess players
 Utut Adianto
 Susanto Megaranto

Poker players
 John Juanda

Racecar drivers
 Ananda Mikola
 Moreno Suprapto

Tennis players
 Yayuk Basuki
 Suharyadi Suharyadi
 Angelique Widjaja

Weightlifters
 Winarni Binti Slamet
 Sri Indriyani
 Raema Lisa Rumbewas
 Eko Yuli Irawan
 Triyatno

Sports venues

Tourism
 Tourism in Indonesia

Tourism Guide Books
 Indonesia Handbook

Airlines and airports
 List of airlines of Indonesia
 List of airports in Indonesia

Gardens in Indonesia

 Bogor Botanical Gardens
 Cibodas Botanical Gardens
 Cibodas Bryophyte Park

World Heritage Sites
World Heritage Sites

Surf breaks in Indonesia
 G-Land
 Lagundri Bay

Theme parks
 Taman Impian Jaya Ancol
 Taman Mini Indonesia Indah
 Trans Studio Bandung
 Trans Studio Makassar
 Kidzania

Zoos
 Ragunan Zoo (Jakarta)
 Surabaya Zoo
 Gembira Loka Zoo

Visitor attractions

Transport
 Transport in Indonesia
 Indonesian car number plates
 Pelni
 TransJakarta

Roads and bridges

Roads
 Jagorawi Toll Road
 Jalan Jaksa

 Jalan Malioboro
 Trans-Sumatran Highway

Bridges
 Sunda Strait Bridge
 Suramadu Bridge

Transport by city
 Transport in Jakarta

Rail
 PT Kereta Api
 Jakarta Monorail

Railway stations

Water transport

Indonesia stubs

See also

 Outline of Indonesia - a smaller list of Indonesia-related articles organized hierarchically
 International rankings of Indonesia
 Lists of country-related topics – similar lists for other countries
 Index of Indonesia-related articles for an alphabetical list of this list

Indonesia